Slovo is a biannual academic journal edited and managed entirely by postgraduates of the UCL School of Slavonic and East European Studies. Slovo is an interdisciplinary publication covering Russian, Eurasian, Central and East European affairs, from the fields of anthropology, economics, film, geography, history, international relations, linguistics, literature, media, politics and sociology. Slovo was produced and distributed through Maney Publishing, but is now available online only through UCL Press.

The first issue of Slovo appeared in May 1988 and included contributions from staff members Geoffrey Hosking and György Schöpflin.

External links 
 

Slavic studies journals
Publications established in 1988
Sociology journals
Biannual journals
English-language journals
Taylor & Francis academic journals
Academic journals edited by students